KTMS (990 AM, "News Talk AM 990") is a commercial radio station in Santa Barbara, California. It is owned by Rincon Broadcasting and airs a talk radio format. KTMS is simulcast on FM translator station K250BS at 97.9 MHz, licensed to Solimar Beach and broadcasting from KTMS' AM transmitter site, overlooking Santa Barbara from near Rattlesnake Canyon Park, along Gibraltar Road, and above Gibraltar Peak, home of most Santa Barbara FM stations. The site is unusual, since AM stations are usually sited in low-lying areas, ideally with the highest possible high ground conductivity. This site is sufficiently close to the population center for even the low night power to serve the whole city.

On weekdays, KTMS mostly carries nationally syndicated talk shows. They include Mike Gallagher, Rush Limbaugh, Sean Hannity, Chad Benson, Larry Elder, Coast to Coast AM with George Noory and America in the Morning with John Trout. Weekends feature shows on health, business, home repair, and pets, including some paid programming. Syndicated hosts include Leo Laporte, Kim Komando, Gary Sullivan and Bill Cunningham.

History of KTMS
On October 31, 1937, KTMS first signed on the air on 1220 AM, with 500 watts. It was founded by Santa Barbara News-Press publisher Thomas More Storke (hence the station call sign). KTMS was an NBC Blue Network affiliate, carrying its schedule of dramas, comedies, news, sports, game shows, soap operas, and big band broadcasts during the "Golden Age of Radio". Among the programs produced at the station was 1-2-5 Club, which debuted in 1937 and was hosted by disc jockey Bob Ruth for many years.

In 1941, KTMS moved to them 1250 AM frequency, where it would stay for 57 years. The move was coupled with a power increase to 1,000 watts. When the Blue Network became ABC in 1945, KTMS maintained its affiliation, while also carrying shows from the Mutual Broadcasting System and the Don Lee Network.

In 1965, KTMS acquired an FM radio station, KRCW (97.5), and renamed it KTMS-FM. At first, it mostly simulcast programs heard on 1250 AM but later became separately programmed with a beautiful music format. In 1985, it switched its call letters to KHTY and flipped to top 40.

In January 1996, Engles Enterprises, Inc. purchased KTMS and KHTY for $2 million. Nearly three years later, in September 1998, the 1250 AM frequency on which KTMS aired was sold for $1.6 million to Smith Broadcasting Group, Inc., owner of the local ABC television affiliate KEYT-TV (channel 3). Smith immediately launched a competing news-only format on 1250 with new call letters KEYT to match its TV sister station. Meanwhile, the KTMS call sign and news/talk format moved to 990 AM.

In 1997, KTMS was purchased by Clear Channel Communications. In January 2007, Clear Channel sold its six Santa Barbara stations, including KTMS, to Rincon Broadcasting LLC for $17.3 million.  Rincon, a subsidiary of Ventura-based Point Broadcasting, officially took control of the cluster on January 16.

History of the 990 AM frequency in Santa Barbara
The original station on 990 AM signed on August 6, 1963 as KGUD (K-Good Radio) and sported a country music format. In 1967, radio and television personality Dick Clark purchased the station and its FM counterpart (now KTYD). In September 1971, Clark sold KGUD-AM-FM to a group led by Harold S. Greenberg for $310,000. KGUD adopted the KTYD call letters in 1973 and began simulcasting the album-oriented rock format of its FM counterpart, then known as KTYD-FM, but briefly returned to country the following decade. Before becoming KTMS in 1998, KGUD attempted a number of formats, including religious programming, Broadway showtunes, and jazz, but none was successful.

References

General references
Sies, Luther F. Encyclopedia of American Radio 1920-1960. Jefferson, NC: McFarland, 2000.

External links

FCC History Cards for KTMS 

TMS
News and talk radio stations in the United States
Radio stations established in 1937
1937 establishments in California